The 1934 All-Ireland Senior Football Championship was the 48th staging of Ireland's premier Gaelic football knock-out competition. Galway won they ended Cavan's campaign in the All Ireland semi-final.

Golden Jubilee
The All-Ireland Senior Football Championship 1934 marked the fiftieth anniversary of the foundation of the Gaelic Athletic Association.

Results

Connacht Senior Football Championship

Leinster Senior Football Championship

Munster Senior Football Championship

Ulster Senior Football Championship

All-Ireland Senior Football Championship

Championship statistics

Miscellaneous

 The Magherafelt fields became known as Rossa Park.
 The Tullamore Grounds become known as O'Connor Park.
 Galway win their second All Ireland title the Connacht championship became seeded this year until 1940 not allowing Galway and Mayo meet before a Connacht final.

References